Mary Lynn Veach Sadler is an American poet, writer, and playwright.

Biography
A native of North Carolina, she holds a doctorate and a master's degree from the University of Illinois and a bachelor's degree from Duke University. She formerly served as Vice president and Dean of Academic Affairs at Methodist College (now Methodist University) and as President of Johnson State College in Vermont. She is a member of the North Carolina Playwright’s Alliance. She currently works as a full-time writer, and her work has appeared in hundreds of print and electronic publications.

Awards 
 Distinguished Woman of North Carolina, 1992
 Panelist Choice Award, Albee Last Frontier Theatre Conference, 2000
 Pittsburgh Quarterly Hay Prize, 2001
 Sue Saniel Elkind Poetry Contest, First Place tie, 2002
 Cape Fear Crime Festival Award, 2002
 Cecil Hemley Memorial Award, Poetry Society of America, 2003
 Lee Witte Poetry Contest, Mount Olive Review, 2003
 Robert Olen Butler Prize (Del Sol Press), Top Ten Finalist, 2004
 Charles Dickson Chapbook Prize, Georgia Poetry Society, 2005
 Pinter Review Prize for Drama, Silver Medalist, 2005
 Abroad Writer’s Contest/Fellowship (France) 2006
 Bards and Sages Writing Competition, 2nd Place, 2006
 Good Reads Fiction Book Competition, Honorable Mention, 2007
 Beach Book Festival, Honorable Mention, 2008
 Judith Seigel Pearson Award, Wayne State University, 2008
 Gilbert-Chappell Distinguished Poet, North Carolina Poetry Society 2013

Books 
 Margaret Drabble, Twayne Publishers (University of Michigan), 1986
 Tonight I Lie with William Cullen Bryant, Publishers Circulation Corp, 1998
 Poet Geography, Mount Olive College Press, 2003
 The Men of Endor: Their Works and Times, 1861-1876 (with Robert Albert Wiesner), Railroad House Historical Association, 2006
 Foot Ways, Bards and Sages Publishing, 2007
 Not Dreamt of In Your Philosophy, Bards and Sages Publishing, 2008

References

External links
 Hot Metal Press

20th-century American poets
21st-century American poets
American educators
American women poets
Living people
Poets from North Carolina
20th-century American women writers
21st-century American women writers
Year of birth missing (living people)